Lee Hall (December 15, 1934 – April 17, 2017) was an American painter, writer, educator, and a university president. She was an abstract landscape painter. She served as the 13th president of Rhode Island School of Design (RISD). In 1993, Hall wrote a controversial book on the artists Willem de Kooning and Elaine de Kooning.

Early life and education 
Lee Hall was born on December 15, 1934 in Lexington, North Carolina. Her parents divorced when she was young and her early childhood was spent in Florida.

She attended the Woman’s College of the University of North Carolina, in Greensboro (now the University of North Carolina at Greensboro) and received a BFA degree in 1955. She had studied under painter John Opper. She continued her studies at New York University and received a MA degree in art education in 1959, followed by a PhD in creative arts in 1965. She did postdoctoral work at Warburg Institute.

Art career 
Hall was an abstract landscape painter. Early in her career she formed relationships with painters Elaine and Willem de Kooning, and art dealer Betty Parsons. She had exhibited her paintings alongside Jackson Pollock, Mark Rothko, and Robert Motherwell. For many years she had maintained her painting studio on a farm in Lyme, Connecticut.

Lee’s art is held in many museum collections including the Indianapolis Museum of Art, the Montclair Art Museum, the Seattle Art Museum, the Newark Museum of Art, the Hudson River Museum, the Weatherspoon Art Museum, the Rhode Island School of Design Museum, the Bechtler Museum of Modern Art, and the Mint Museum.

Teaching and arts administration 
Hall taught at State University of New York at Potsdam (SUNY Potsdam) from 1958 until 1960; she was an Associate Professor and Head of the Department of Art at Keuka College from 1960 until 1962; she taught at Winthrop College (now Winthrop University) from 1962 until 1965; and served as Chair of the Department of Art at Drew University from 1965 until 1974.

From 1975 until 1983, Hall served as the 13th President of the Rhode Island School of Design in Providence. During her tenure at RISD Hall was part of the effort to introduce the first computer system for the administration, she was in leadership during the unionization of the faculty, she worked to revision of the faculty manual, and restructure the financial administration. On June 30, 1983, Hall stepped down from her role as president of RISD and she was succeeded by Thomas F. Schutte.

Later career 
After RISD, Hall became a partner in the Betty Parsons Gallery in New York City as well as joined the Academy for Educational Development (AED) the following year.

In 1993, Hall released the book Elaine and Bill, Portrait of a Marriage: The Lives of Willem and Elaine de Kooning (1993, HarperCollins) which was highly debated amongst artists and caused controversy due to the portrayal of Elaine de Kooning as "a sexual predator".

Hall died of stomach cancer on April 17, 2017 in Northampton, Massachusetts.

Publications

See also 
 List of presidents of the Rhode Island School of Design

References

External links 
Lee Hall papers, circa 1870s–2017, bulk 1975–2010, from Archives of American Art, Smithsonian Institution

1934 births
2017 deaths
People from Lexington, North Carolina
People from Lyme, Connecticut
People from South Hadley, Massachusetts
State University of New York at Potsdam faculty
Keuka College faculty
Winthrop University faculty
Drew University faculty
Presidents of the Rhode Island School of Design
American women writers
American women painters
Abstract expressionist artists
Deaths from cancer in Massachusetts
Deaths from stomach cancer
University of North Carolina at Greensboro alumni
New York University alumni
Women heads of universities and colleges